San Bartolo is a district in southern Lima Province in Peru. It is bordered by the Pacific Ocean on the west, the district of Punta Negra on the north, the Huarochirí Province on the east, and the Santa María del Mar District  on the south.

It is well known for its beaches and attracts many beachgoers every summer. Many of them also rent apartments during this season, making the district's population increase considerably. San Bartolo has some restaurants and a club with a large seawater swimming pool.

See also 
 Administrative divisions of Peru
Cono Sur
Punta Hermosa
Miraflores
Chorrillos
La Punta
Ancón
Asia
Santa Rosa

References

External links
 
  Municipalidad Distrital de San Bartolo
  http://www.olasperu.com/  Peru's prime surfing website
  http://www.peruazul.com/ Limas's suring website

Districts of Lima